Lesimano Island (also called Brewer Island) is an island off the north coast of Sariba, in Milne Bay Province, Papua New Guinea.

Administration 
The island belongs to Sidudu Ward of Bwanabwana Rural Local Level Government Area LLG, Samarai-Murua District, which are in Milne Bay Province.

Geography 
The island is part of the Sariba group, itself a part of Samarai Islands of the Louisiade Archipelago.

Demographics 
The island was previously inhabited.

References

Islands of Milne Bay Province
Louisiade Archipelago